The Key West quail-dove (Geotrygon chrysia) is a species of bird from the doves and pigeon family Columbidae. It is probably most closely related to the bridled quail-dove.

Distribution and habitat
The Key West quail-dove breeds in the Bahamas and, except for Jamaica, throughout the Greater Antilles.  Despite its name, it does not currently breed in the Florida Keys and southern mainland Florida.

This bird is found in tropical and subtropical dry forests, shrublands, and lowland moist forests.

Diet
These birds forage on the ground, mainly eating seeds, berries and fallen fruit. It is fond of poisonwood fruit.  It will also take snails in its diet.

Breeding
Although no longer breeding in Florida, it occasionally is still recorded in the Keys and southern Florida as a vagrant.  It lays two buff-colored eggs on a flimsy platform built on a shrub.  Some nests are built on the ground.

Description
The Key West quail-dove is approximately 27–31 cm in length.   The bird is distinguished by having a dark rust-colored back and similarly colored wings.  It has some amethyst or bronze green iridescence on its crown, nape and in the back of its neck.  The mantle, back, rump and inner wing coverts show some purplish red iridescence.   It also has a bold white facial stripe.  Its call is similar that of the white-tipped dove.

References

Columbidae
Endemic birds of the Caribbean
Birds of Hispaniola
Birds of the Dominican Republic
Birds of Puerto Rico
Birds of the Greater Antilles
Birds described in 1855
Taxa named by Charles Lucien Bonaparte